This is a list of the current owners of French football clubs, as well as (in some cases) their estimated net worth and source of wealth.

Ligue 1

Ligue 2

National

National 2

References

owners